Windsor is a city in Henry and Pettis counties, Missouri, United States. The population was 2,901 at the 2010 census.

History
Windsor was laid out in 1855, and originally known as Belmont. Its name was changed to Windsor in 1859, after Windsor Castle, in England. A post office called Windsor has been in operation since 1850.

Geography
The city is located in northeast Henry County and extends to the northeast into the southwest corner of Pettis County. It is at the intersection of Missouri routes 52 and 2. Clinton is 16 miles to the southwest, Warrensburg is about 18 miles to the northwest and Sedalia is approximately 18 miles to the northeast. The east fork of Tebo Creek flows past the west side of the city.

Demographics

2010 census
As of the census of 2010, there were 2,901 people, 1,193 households, and 781 families living in the city. The racial makeup of the city was 96.8% White, 0.1% African American, 1.1% Native American, 0.2% Asian, 0.2% Pacific Islander, 0.1% from other races, and 1.4% from two or more races. Hispanic or Latino of any race were 2.0% of the population.

There were 1,193 households, of which 31.3% had children under the age of 18 living with them, 48.4% were married couples living together, 12.4% had a female householder with no husband present, 4.7% had a male householder with no wife present, and 34.5% were non-families. 29.6% of all households were made up of individuals, and 13.1% had someone living alone who was 65 years of age or older. The average household size was 2.39 and the average family size was 2.94.

The median age in the city was 38.2 years. 24.8% of residents were under the age of 18; 8.2% were between the ages of 18 and 24; 24.9% were from 25 to 44; 23.4% were from 45 to 64; and 18.8% were 65 years of age or older. The gender makeup of the city was 47.5% male and 52.5% female.

2000 census
As of the census of 2000, there were 3,087 people, 1,280 households, and 848 families living in the city. The population density was 1,310.5 people per square mile (505.0/km). There were 1,418 housing units at an average density of 602.0 per square mile (232.0/km). The ethnical makeup of the city was 97.02% White, 0.52% African American, 0.65% Native American, 0.26% Asian, 0.36% from other races, and 1.20% from two or more ethnicities. Hispanic or Latino of any ethnicity were 0.52% of the population.

There were 1,280 households, out of which 30.7% had children under the age of 18 living with them, 52.0% were married couples living together, 10.5% had a female householder with no husband present, and 33.7% were non-families. 29.5% of all households were made up of individuals, and 16.2% had someone living alone who was 65 years of age or older. The average household size was 2.38 and the average family size was 2.91.

In the city, the population was spread out, with 25.3% under the age of 18, 8.4% from 18 to 24, 26.8% from 25 to 44, 20.1% from 45 to 64, and 19.5% who were 65 years of age or older. The median age was 38 years. For every 100 females, there were 88.5 males. For every 100 females age 18 and over, there were 84.4 males.

The median income for a household in the city was $29,922, and the median income for a family was $32,477. Males had a median income of $27,986 versus $19,605 for females. The per capita income for the city was $16,052. About 16.5% of families and 16.5% of the population were below the poverty line, including 18.0% of those under age 18 and 19.7% of those age 65 or over.

Education
Windsor is within the Henry County R-1 School District, which operates an elementary school, and a junior and senior high school.

Windsor has a public library, a branch of the Henry County Library.

Points of interest 
Windsor is home to the point where the Rock Island Spur connects to the Katy Trail.

Notable people 

Charles Stark Draper, American scientist and engineer, founder of the Charles Stark Draper Laboratory, born in Windsor
Helen Duhamel (1904–1991), Rapid City, South Dakota, businesswoman and broadcaster, born in Windsor
 Winfred J. Sanborn, Los Angeles, California, City Council member, born in or near Windsor

References

External links

 City of Windsor official website
 Windsor Chamber of Commerce
 Windsor Slideshow and Data
 Historic maps of Windsor in the Sanborn Maps of Missouri Collection at the University of Missouri

Cities in Henry County, Missouri
Cities in Pettis County, Missouri
Cities in Missouri